Phytoecia tirellii is a species of beetle in the family Cerambycidae. It was described by Luigioni in 1913. It is known from Italy. It feeds on Crepis lacera.

References

Phytoecia
Beetles described in 1913